Carayaca is a city located in Vargas, Venezuela.

References

Cities in Vargas (state)